Mystery Giver (foaled April 29, 1998 in Illinois) is a retired American Thoroughbred racehorse best known for winning three consecutive editions of the Fair Grounds Handicap at the Fair Grounds Race Course in New Orleans, Louisiana. Trained by longtime trainer Richard Scherer, Mystery Giver set the track record at the Fair Grounds in the Mervin H. Muniz Jr. Memorial Handicap. Scherer continues to race horses at the Fair Grounds during the winter, while spending the rest of the year in Chicago at Arlington Park and Hawthorne Race Course.

References
 Mystery Giver's pedigree and partial racing stats
 February 15, 2003 Thoroughbred Times article titled Mystery Giver voted Illinois horse of the year
 January 31, 2004 FOX Sports article titled Mystery Giver Completes Fair Grounds 3-Peat
 Profile of Mystery Giver by Joe Paschen at Chicago Barn To Wire

1998 racehorse births
Racehorses bred in Illinois
Racehorses trained in the United States
Thoroughbred family 4-m